The Neradje Mosque or Neradjes, formerly known as Gazi Hüseyin Pasha Mosque is a historical Ottoman-era mosque located in the old town of Rethymno, Crete, Greece. It now serves as a music school.

History 
The building in the past was a Catholic monastery of the Augustinian Order named Santa Maria. After the conquest of Rethymno by the Ottomans, the monastery was turned into a mosque, which was known as the Mosque of Gazi Hüseyin Pasha or the Neradje Mosque. Following the 1923 population exchange between Turkey and Greece and the departure of the Muslim population of Crete in 1924, the building was turned into a music school.

The minaret was built in 1890, during the last years of Turkish rule in Crete, by the engineer Georgios Daskalakis.

Structure 
The building has a rectangular shape and three semicircular domes. It possesses of one minaret which has two balconies, the tallest in the town. The building has Renaissance elements, such as a circular skylight and Renaissance style windows and door. The doorway of the church consists of two semi-columns on each side with Corinthian-style columns and a separate pedestal for each, which support the trigos. Above the door and below the threshold there is an arch, and a large fork in the middle of the bow. Semi-elliptical niches have been opened between the two columns on each side. The composition is believed to be based on the work of Sebastiano Serlio.

See also 
 Islam in Greece
 List of mosques in Greece
 List of former mosques in Greece

References

External links 
 

Ottoman architecture in Crete
Ottoman mosques in Greece
Former mosques in Greece
19th-century mosques
19th-century architecture in Greece
Buildings and structures in Crete
Mosques completed in 1890
Tourist attractions in Crete
Mosque buildings with domes
Mosques converted from churches in Ottoman Greece